Aramais Grigorian (born March 31, 1973) is an Armenian figure skater. He is the 2003-2004 Armenian national champion.

Competitive highlights

 QR = Qualifying round

References
 

Armenian figure skaters
Sportspeople from Yerevan
1973 births
Living people